Storms of Life is the debut studio album by American country music artist Randy Travis, released on June 2, 1986, by Warner Bros. Records Nashville. Certified 3× Multi-Platinum by the RIAA for American shipments of three million copies. it features the singles "On the Other Hand" (previously recorded by Keith Whitley on his 1985 album L.A. to Miami), "1982", "Diggin' up Bones" and "No Place Like Home". Although "On the Other Hand" charted at number 67 on the Hot Country Songs chart upon its initial release, the song reached number one on the same chart once it was re-released, following "1982" which peaked at number six. "Diggin' up Bones" also reached number one, while "No Place Like Home" peaked at number two.

"There'll Always Be a Honky Tonk Somewhere" was later recorded by Daron Norwood for his second album Ready, Willing and Able.

The 35th anniversary edition of the album was released on 24 September 2021. The anniversary edition includes remastered versions of the original ten tracks, as well as three previously unreleased songs ("Ain't No Use", "The Wall" and "Carryin' Fire"), labelled "From the Vault".

Track listing

Production
All tracks produced by Kyle Lehning, except "On the Other Hand" and "Reasons I Cheat", produced by Lehning and Keith Stegall.

Personnel

 Baillie & the Boys – background vocals
 Eddie Bayers – drums
 Kenny Bell – acoustic guitar
 Thomas Brannon – background vocals
 Dennis Burnside – keyboards
 Larry Byrom – acoustic guitar, electric guitar
 Mark Casstevens – acoustic guitar
 Paul Davis – background vocals
 Jerry Douglas – dobro
 Phil Forrest – background vocals
 Steve Gibson – electric guitar
 Doyle Grisham – steel guitar
 Mark Hembree – acoustic bass
 Hoot Hester – fiddle
 David Hungate – bass guitar
 Don Jackson – clarinet
 Greg Jennings – electric guitar
 Kirk "Jelly Roll" Johnson – harmonica, percussion
 Shane Keister – keyboards
 Kyle Lehning – keyboards, background vocals
 Larrie Londin – drums
 Terry McMillan – harmonica, percussion
 Fred Newell – electric guitar
 Mark O'Connor – fiddle, mandolin
 Paul Overstreet – background vocals
 Michael Rhodes – bass guitar
 Lisa Silver – background vocals
 Blaine Sprouse – fiddle
 Diane Stegall – background vocals
 Keith Stegall – electric guitar
 James Stroud – drums
 Bobby Thompson – acoustic guitar
 Randy Travis – lead vocals
 Jack Williams – bass guitar
 Bobby Wood – keyboards

Charts

Weekly charts

Year-end charts

Certifications

References

1986 debut albums
Randy Travis albums
Warner Records albums
Albums produced by Kyle Lehning
Canadian Country Music Association Top Selling Album albums